The kittel or skittel is a narrow drum with one goat skin head, played with two mallets to give a syncopated rhythm in Guyanese masquerade and street bands. Guyanese slaves used to celebrate the end of the crop season when the farms owners would allow them to perform with drums, dance and singing.

References

External links
Video - Masquerade
https://web.archive.org/web/20090504004319/http://gina.gov.gy/archive/daily/b090127.html

Membranophones
British Guyanese musical instruments